Briana Marie "Bri" Campos Barriéntez (born 3 February 1994) is a former American-born Mexican professional footballer who last played as a right-back for Swedish Damallsvenskan club Vittsjö GIK and the Mexico women's national team.

Early life
Campos was born in Aurora, Colorado, United States to Mexican parents Louie Campos and Celina Barriéntez. She has two sisters named Monica and Larissa.

Baylor University
Campos attended Baylor University where she majored in health, kinesiology and recreation.

Club career

Åland United
On 9 February 2016, Finnish side Åland United announced Campos as one of their signings for that year's season.

International career
Campos played for the U-20 Mexican Women's National Team, twice in 2012 and three times in 2013. Her first senior Mexican Women's National Team call up was in September 2017 and she received her first cap on October 24, 2017, versus North Korea in the 2017 Yongchuan International Tournament.

References

External links
 

1994 births
Living people
People from Aurora, Colorado
Soccer players from Colorado
American sportspeople of Mexican descent
American women's soccer players
Citizens of Mexico through descent
Mexican women's footballers
Women's association football forwards
Baylor Bears women's soccer players
Åland United players
Kansallinen Liiga players
Mexico women's international footballers
Mexican expatriate women's footballers
Mexican expatriate sportspeople in Finland
Expatriate women's footballers in Finland
American expatriate women's soccer players
American expatriate sportspeople in Finland
Damallsvenskan players
Umeå IK players
 Baylor University alumni